Deep Run is a tributary of Jones Falls a stream in Baltimore County, Maryland, in the United States.

References

Rivers of Maryland
Rivers of Baltimore County, Maryland